Heidi Ahonen (born 25 March 1984) is a retired Finnish footballer. Ahonen was capped 13 times for Finland.

International career

Ahonen was also part of the Finnish team at the 2005 European Championships.

References

1984 births
People from Kerava
Living people
Kansallinen Liiga players
Finnish women's footballers
Finland women's international footballers
Women's association football midfielders

Helsingin Jalkapalloklubi (women) players